Miss World America 2020 was the 12th edition of the Miss World America pageant. it was held virtually due to COVID-19 on October, 2020. Emmy Rose Cuvelier of South Dakota crowned her successor Alissa Anderegg of New York at the end of the event and was originally to represent United States at Miss World 2021. However, Anderegg ended her reign on October 3, 2021, and Shree Saini of Washington who was appointed the role of Miss World America 2021 and competed at Miss World 2021 where she placed as 1st Runner-Up.

Results

Placements

Miss World America 2020 Preliminary Winners

Judges 

 Andria Vassilious
 Ariel Chobaz
 Ché Amor Greenigde - Miss World Barbados 2019
 Christian Pelayo
 Jennifer Lloyd
 Jesse LeBeau
 Josie Valdez
 Kaya Jones
 Lisa McCumber
 RC Caylan
 Stan W. Raynolds
 Sarah Marschke - Miss World Australia 2019

Contestants 

30 delegates were confirmed.

Other pageant notes

Did not compete

Crossovers 

Contestants who previously competed at or will be competing at other beauty pageants:

 Miss USA

 2017: : Megan Gordon (Top 5)
 2019: : Manya Saaraswat (as )
 2021: : Taylor Fogg
 2023: : Manju Bangalore (TBA) 

Miss America
 2017: : Alissa Musto (Top 15)

Miss America's Outstanding Teen
 2013:  Mississippi: Molly May (4th runner-up)

 Miss World America

 2018: : Manju Bangalore (Top 10)
 2018:  Mississippi: Molly May (Top 10)
 2019: : Amulya Chava
 2019: : Manju Bangalore (Top 10, as )
 2019: : Megan Gordon (1st Runner-Up)
 2019: : Shree Saini
 Miss India USA

 2017: : Shree Saini (Winner)
 Miss Asian America

 2019: : Melanie Wardhana (Winner)

References

External links 

 Miss World Official Website
 Miss World America Official Website

2019
2020 beauty pageants